The Whistler Film Festival (WFF) is an annual film festival held in Whistler, British Columbia, Canada. Established in 2001, the festival is held the first weekend of December and includes juried competitive sections, the Borsos Awards, and the Pandora Audience Award. A conference for the Canadian film industry, known as the Whistler Summit, is organised in connection with the film festival.

The festival has built up a reputation as one of the most important Canadian film festivals despite its location in a much smaller community than most of the other major festivals, particularly as a premiere venue for Canadian independent films. Some film critics have even gone so far as to suggest that the festival is emerging as Canada's equivalent to the influential American Sundance Film Festival.

As of 2015, the Whistler Film Festival bills itself as "Canada's coolest film festival" and has been increasingly attracting more distributors and sales agents. The 2015 festival presented the Canadian premiere of Carol  and the world premiere of Rehearsal  among other world premieres. About half the films screened are Canadian and Paul Gratton, who became the festival's director of programming in June 2012, would like the Whistler Film Festival to become a "mini-Sundance" for Canadian films.

Due to the COVID-19 pandemic in Canada, the 2020 festival was staged entirely online. While most other Canadian film festivals which were staged online in 2020 geoblocked their service so that only viewers within the festival's home province were able to watch the films, Whistler made virtually its entire lineup available across Canada. In the same year, the festival also launched the Adventure Film Series, a summer program of films about adventure sports.

Film competitions and awards

The Whistler Film Festival features eight juried competitions with the following awards handed out at the Awards Brunch on the last day of the festival or post-event:

Borsos Competition: ($15,000 cash award presented by the Directors Guild of Canada – British Columbia with a $20,000 Post Production Prize sponsored by Company 3 LLC for winning film); Best Direction in a Borsos film presented by the Directors Guild of Canada – British Columbia; Best Cinematography in a Borsos film presented by ICG 669; Best Performance in a Borsos film; and Best Screenplay of a Borsos film
Best Feature Documentary
Mountain Culture Award presented by Whistler Blackcomb
Canadian ShortWork Award ($1,000 cash award)
International ShortWork Award
Student ShortWork Award ($500 cash award), presented by Capilano University Film Centre
Best BC Directors Award presented by the Directors Guild of Canada – British Columbia
Alliance of Women Film Journalists EDA Awards for Best Female-Directed Narrative Feature, Short Film and Documentary
MPPIA Short Film Award ($15,000 cash award plus up to $100,000 in services) presented by MPPIA and Creative BC, sponsored by Bridge Studios
'''Audience Award for Best Feature of the Festival (non-cash prize)

The Borsos Awards are named after Canadian filmmaker Phillip Borsos. The Audience Award is a non-cash prize presented to the highest-rated film as voted by the audience.

References

External links
 Official site

Film festivals established in 2001